The Songheung Line (松興線, Shōkō-sen) was a  narrow gauge railway line of the Chōsen Railway (Chōtetsu) of colonial-era Korea, located in South Hamgyeong Province. There was a  cable-hauled section between Baekamsan and Hamnam Songheung.

History
On 1 February 1928, the Chōsen Railway extended its Hamnam Line by opening a  section from Pungsang to Hamnam Songheung. Two years later, on 1 February 1930 the Hamnam Line was taken over by a newly established subsidiary company, the Sinheung Railway, and on 15 January 1932, after the existing Hamnam Songheung Station was renamed Hasonghung Station, the present Hamnam Songheung Station was opened  from Hasongheung, and on 10 September 1933, the line was extended  to Bujeonhoban. 

The Sinheung Railway was absorbed by Chōtetsu on 22 April 1938, and Chōtetsu separated the Hamnam Sinheung–Bujeonhoban section from the Hamnam Line, naming that portion the Songheung Line.

After the establishment of North Korea and the nationalisation of its railways, the Hamnam Line was split up, with the Hamheung - Oro - Sinheung section being merged with the Songheung Line to create the present Sinheung Line.

Services
In the November 1942 timetable, the last issued prior to the start of the Pacific War, Chōtetsu operated the following schedule of third-class-only local passenger services:

Route

References

Rail transport in North Korea
Rail transport in Korea
Korea under Japanese rule
Defunct railway companies of Japan
Defunct railway companies of Korea
Chosen Railway